"Bat Country" is a song by Avenged Sevenfold, released in August 2005 as the second single from their third album, City of Evil. Avenged Sevenfold won 'Best New Artist Video' at the 2006 MTV Video Music Awards for "Bat Country" and on October 1, 2009, the single was certified gold by the RIAA. For these reasons, "Bat Country" is often believed to be the band's most commercially successful song.

Background and content
The song's main influence comes from Hunter S. Thompson's 1971 novel Fear and Loathing in Las Vegas, and the title itself also comes from a line from the book in which Raoul Duke, the alter-ego pseudonym of Thompson himself, is on his way to Las Vegas while being affected by various drugs, and thus hallucinates, seeing huge bats and manta rays in the sky. With this, he gasps to his companion and attorney, Dr. Gonzo, "We can't stop here. This is bat country."

The following quote, also included at the beginning of Fear and Loathing in Las Vegas, is referred to twice throughout the song (at the beginning and the bridge before the last chorus) and is shown at the beginning of the music video.
"He who makes a beast of himself gets rid of the pain of being a man." – Samuel Johnson

Also referenced in the song is a lyric derived from the final words spoken about Dr. Gonzo at the end of the film adaptation.  The lyric is used at the end of the second breakdown of the song, as the final lyric of the song.
"There he goes. One of God's own prototypes. A high-powered mutant of some kind never even considered for mass production. Too weird to live, and too rare to die." – Raoul Duke

Shortly after the writing of the song, Thompson committed suicide.

Track listing

Legacy
The song was ranked at number 20 on Loudwires Top 21st Century Hard Rock Songs. It also was rated as number 9 on Ultimate Guitar's list of Top 25 Best Songs With Guitar Duels. In 2020, Louder Sound and Kerrang! both rated it as the fifth greatest Avenged Sevenfold song.

Charts and sales

Weekly charts

Certifications

Personnel
Personnel listing as adapted from album liner notes.

Avenged Sevenfold
 M. Shadows – lead vocals, backing vocals
 Zacky Vengeance – rhythm guitar, co-lead guitar, backing vocals
 The Rev – drums, backing vocals
 Synyster Gates – lead guitar, backing vocals
 Johnny Christ – bass, backing vocals

Production
Produced by Mudrock and Avenged Sevenfold, with additional production by Fred Archambault and Scott Gilman
Mixed by Andy Wallace
Pro Tools by John O'Mahony, assisted by Steve Sisco
Mastered by Eddie Schreyer
Additional vocal production by the Rev, Synyster Gates and M. Shadows
Orchestration by Scott Gilman, the Rev, Synyster Gates and M. Shadows
Drum tech – Mike Fasano
Guitar tech – Stephen Ferrara-Grand

Session musicians
Violinists – Samuel Fischer (soloist), Mark Robertson, Songa Lee-Kitto, Sam Formicola, Bruce Dukov, Alan Grunfeld, Larry Greenfield, Liane Mautner
Violists – David Walther, Matthew Funes, Alma Fernandez
Cellists – Victor Lawrence (soloist), David Low, David Mergen

Choir
Choir leader – Jeannine Wagner
Choir performers – Zachary Biggs, Colton Beyer-Johnson, Josiah Yiu, Nathan Cruz, Stephen Cruz, C.J. Cruz, Sean Sullivan, Alan Hong, Nico Walsh, Sally Stevens

References

2005 singles
Avenged Sevenfold songs
Music videos directed by Marc Klasfeld
Warner Records singles